National Law University, Delhi (NLUD) is a National Law University in India, offering courses at the undergraduate and postgraduate levels. Situated in Sector-14, Dwarka, New Delhi, India, NLUD is one of the national law schools in India built on the five-year law degree model proposed and implemented by the Bar Council of India. The National Law University Act, 2007 provides for the Chief Justice of India to be the university's visitor, whereas the Chief Justice of the High Court of Delhi to function as the university's chancellor. whereas its vice-chancellor functions as the chief administrator.

History

National Law University, Delhi was established in 2008 by Act No. 1 of 2008 of NCT Delhi in the National Capital Territory of Delhi with the initiative of the High Court of Delhi under the leadership of Ranbir Singh, the founder-director and vice-chancellor of the Nalsar University of Law, Hyderabad), who became the university's vice-chancellor. It was inaugurated by then President of India, Pratibha Patil. The college started functioning in 2008 from temporary buildings. By 2010, the college had completed its construction and was fully functional.

Academics

Academic Programmes

Undergraduate
NLUD offers a five-year undergraduate, B.A., LL.B. (Hons.) program. One hundred and ten seats are offered and ten additional seats are allocated to foreign nationals /OCI/ PIO. The undergraduate program is based on a credits system with additional seminar courses for further learning, pursuant according to the interests of the students. The program consists of approximately fifty subjects to be studied over the duration of ten semesters, with five subjects in each semester. Students are expected to submit fifty research projects before their graduation. The curriculum remains intensive and has led to concerns being brought about stress levels amongst the students.

Postgraduate
NLUD also offers a one-year LL.M. program. The admission is through a written test which is conducted by the University followed by an interview. It additionally offers Postgraduate Diploma program in Urban Environmental Management, Judging and Court Management, and IPR and Patent Law along with Doctor of Philosophy (Ph.D).

Admissions
NLUD does not utilize the Common Law Admission Test like other National Law Universities do; admissions to the undergraduate (UG) B.A., LL.B. (Hons.) program are done through the All India Law Entrance Test (AILET), a test conducted every year by the university.

AILET(UG) Pattern

The AILET for B.A.LL.B (Hons.) programme has three (3) sections of 150 multiple choice questions for 150 marks in total. The duration of the examination is 90 minutes.
The three sections are:
Section A: English Language (50 questions; 50 marks).
Section B: Current Affairs & General Knowledge (30 questions; 30 marks).
Section C: Logical Reasoning (70 questions; 70 marks).
Legal principles may be used in the logical reasoning section to test logical aptitude but the examination will not require any kind of legal knowledge or technical understanding.
Negative marking: There will be Negative Marking in AILET 2022-23. The criteria for negative marking will be based on the formula 0.25*4=1 that means per wrong answer 0.25 Marks will be deducted. Therefore, four wrong answers will lead to deduction of 1 Mark.
If two or more candidates get the same marks at the All India Law Entrance Test (AILET), their merit will be determined on the basis of higher marks in the section on LOGICAL REASONING in the AILET 2022.
If the merit is still the same, then the candidate senior in age shall get preference. If still there is no change in merit, then computerized draw of lots shall be taken into consideration.

Rankings
 

The National Institutional Ranking Framework (NIRF) ranked it second among law colleges in 2022.

Justice T. P. S. Chawla Library

The library is named after T. P. S. Chawla, a former judge of the High Court of Delhi who contributed significantly to the development of the library by donating his personal collection of rare volumes to it. The library is fully automated, and book circulation is maintained through electronic Library-cum-Identity Cards with the help of a barcode system. The collection comprises over 41,000 documents, including monographs, commentaries, textbooks, reference books and loose leaf material on various subjects, such as Jurisprudence, Judicial Process, Constitutional law, Intellectual Property, Public International Law, Environmental Law, Alternative Dispute Resolution, Aviation Law, Human Rights, Criminal Law, Cyber Laws, International Business Transactions, and Maritime Law.

The library consists of three storeys.

Research

NLUD currently has thirteen research centres:

Centre for Banking and Financial Laws 
Centre for Child Rights & Juvenile Justice 
Centre for Communication Governance 
Centre for Comparative Law 
Centre for Corporate Law And Governance 
Centre for Constitutional Law, Policy and Governance 
Centre for Criminology and Victimology 
Centre for Comparative Studies in Personal Laws 
Project 39A
Centre for Environmental Law, Policy and Research (CELPR) 
Centre for Innovation, Intellectual Property and Competition (CIIPC) 
Centre for Social Inclusion And Minority Rights 
Centre for Transparency and Accountability in Governance 
Centre for Transnational Commercial Law
NLUD also possesses endowed chairs:
 K.L. Arora Chair in Criminal Law
 Justice B.R. Sawhny Chair in Professional Ethics

Student Life

Kairos
Kairos was the literary and cultural fest of the University. It included a variety of events, which are legal as well as cultural. Each night featured performances by popular stage artists and musicians, which have included The Raghu Dixit Project, Faridkot, Dualist Inquiry, Dhruv Visvanathan, The Urban Earlymen, and the Family Cheese.

Notable Alumni
 Dushyant Chautala, Deputy Chief Minister of Haryana

See also
 Legal education in India
 List of law schools in India

References

External links

 

Educational institutions established in 2008
Law schools in Delhi
National Law Universities
2008 establishments in Delhi